Rachel Bell (born 1950 in Newcastle upon Tyne) is an English actress. Bell has many television credits to her name and has been associated as a long-running character with three series: Margaret Holmes in Grange Hill (1997–2002); Edith Pilchester in The Darling Buds of May (1991–1993); and Louise, the overbearing chair of the divorcee support group in Dear John (1986–1987). She also appeared in the Only Fools and Horses episode "To Hull and Back" (1985) and the Doctor Who story The Happiness Patrol (1988). In 1990 she played a barmaid in Last of the Summer Wine, episode Roll On.

Her films include Sweet William (1980), Red Mercury (2005) and the 2008 Keira Knightley film, The Edge Of Love. In 2010, she played Hyacinth Bucket in a theatrical adaptation of the BBC situation comedy Keeping Up Appearances that toured the UK. In 2017, she began portraying the recurring role of Eve Haskey in the BBC soap opera Doctors.

References

External links
 

1950 births
Actresses from Newcastle upon Tyne
English film actresses
English soap opera actresses
English television actresses
Living people